The action of 15 October 1917 was a naval engagement of World War I between Imperial Germany and the United States off the coast of Mine Head, Ireland.

Action
The American destroyer , commanded by Lieutenant Commander Walter N. Vernou, was operating off the coast of Ireland in October 1917. On anti-submarine patrols and rescue missions, as well as convoy duty. Operating out of Queenstown, Ireland, she was armed with four  guns and eight  torpedo tubes. The German submarine —on a typical unrestricted U-boat mission — was cruising in British waters, attacking Allied shipping. She was armed with a deck gun and torpedoes.

The German submarine sighted Cassin as well, she immediately submerged and began to flee. A pursuit ensued for an hour; at about 14:30, U-61s commander—Victor Dieckmann—decided to engage the tailing American warship.

The Germans then turned about and surfaced to line up for a shot and fired their last torpedo. Gunner's Mate First Class Osmond Ingram noticed the incoming projectile, he quickly ran over to the depth charge gunners and ordered them to jettison the charges before the torpedo struck them. The torpedo struck the destroyer aft on the port side before this could be done and Ingram was killed in the explosion.

The torpedo hit Cassins portside stern, nearly blowing off her rudder. The American destroyer began to steam in circles, but returned a barrage of 4 inch shells which forced the U-boat to dive. Four hits damaged U-61s conning tower which discouraged her commander from continuing to attack.

Besides the American sailor killed, nine others were wounded in the action. The dead sailor—Osmond Ingram—was awarded the Medal of Honor for his service on 15 October. Eventually, another American destroyer  and the British sloops HMS Jessamine and Tamarisk arrived on the scene and protected Cassin throughout the night. However, no further U-boat contacts were made. The damaged USS Cassin was repaired and returned to active duty in July 1918; U-61 was sunk by the  HMS PC.51 a few months later.

See also
Action of 4 May 1917
Action of 17 November 1917
Action of 15 August 1915
Action of 8 May 1918

References

External links

webpage for U-61

Conflicts in 1917
Naval battles of World War I involving Germany
Naval battles of World War I involving the United States
Atlantic operations of World War I
October 1917 events